The National Games of Colombia, known in Spanish as the Juegos Deportivos  Nacionales, is the premier multi-sport event of Colombia at national level.  The first instance of the event was organized in 1928 and for several years it took place at irregular intervals of time.  The Colombian Sports Institute took charge of the organization of the games in 1968.  The event has been held regularly every 4 years since 1988. 

Valle del Cauca has been the most successful department in the history of the national games (7 times), followed by Antioquia (6 times) and next Bogotá (one time).

Results

References
 Historia de los Juegos Nacionales
 Página oficial de los Juegos Nacionales 2008
 Reseña de los Juegos Nacionales en El Colombiano

Multi-sport events in Colombia
Colombia
Recurring sporting events established in 1928